Francis Moulds (13 October 1910 - 24 November 1973) was a Scottish footballer who played for St Johnstone, Kilmarnock and Dumbarton.

References

1910 births
1958 deaths
Scottish footballers
Dumbarton F.C. wartime guest players
St Johnstone F.C. players
Kilmarnock F.C. wartime guest players
Association football defenders